The Carnegie Hall Concerts: December 1944 is a live album by American pianist, composer and bandleader Duke Ellington recorded at Carnegie Hall, in New York City in 1944 and released on the Prestige label in 1977.

Reception
The AllMusic review by Scott Yanow awarded the album 4 stars and stated: "Lots of great moments from this brilliant orchestra occurred during this concert".

Track listing
All compositions by Duke Ellington except as indicated
 "Blutopia" - 4:22  
 "Midriff" (Billy Strayhorn) - 4:00  
 "Creole Love Call" - 6:29  
 "Suddenly It Jumped" - 2:50  
 "Pitter Panther Patter" - 2:57  
 "It Don't Mean a Thing (If It Ain't Got That Swing)" - 3:56  
 "Things Ain't What They Used to Be" (Mercer Ellington) - 5:17  
 "Perfume Suite: Introduction" - 0:54  
 "Perfume Suite: Sonata" - 3:15  
 "Perfume Suite: Strange Feeling" - 5:09  
 'Perfume Suite: Dancers in Love" - 2:33  
 "Purfume Suite: Coloratura" - 3:24  
 "Work Song" - 7:00  
 "The Blues" - 5:25  
 "Three Dances: West Indian Dance/Creamy Brown/Emancipation Celebration" - 6:29  
 "Come Sunday" - 11:48  
 "The Mood to Be Wooed" - 4:47  
 "Blue Cellophane" - 3:15  
 "Blue Skies" (Irving Berlin) - 3:34  
 "Frankie and Johnny" (Traditional) - 8:08  
Recorded at Carnegie Hall in New York on December 19, 1944.

Personnel
Duke Ellington – piano
Rex Stewart - cornet
Cat Anderson, Shelton Hemphill, Taft Jordan - trumpet
Ray Nance - trumpet, violin
Lawrence Brown, Joe Nanton - trombone
Claude Jones - valve trombone
Otto Hardwick - alto saxophone, clarinet 
Johnny Hodges - alto saxophone
Jimmy Hamilton - clarinet, tenor saxophone
Al Sears - tenor saxophone
Harry Carney - baritone saxophone, clarinet, bass clarinet
Fred Guy - guitar
Junior Raglin - bass
Hillard Brown - drums
Kay Davis (track 3), Ray Nance (track 6), Al Hibbler (track 10), Marie Ellington (track 14) - vocals

References

Duke Ellington live albums
1977 live albums
Live orchestral jazz albums
Prestige Records live albums
Albums recorded at Carnegie Hall